Farouk Shikalo (born 10 December 1996) is a Kenyan football goalkeeper who plays for Mtibwa Sugar.

References

1996 births
Living people
Kenyan footballers
Kenya international footballers
Muhoroni Youth F.C. players
Tusker F.C. players
Posta Rangers F.C. players
Bandari F.C. (Kenya) players
Young Africans S.C. players
Association football goalkeepers
Kenyan expatriate footballers
Expatriate footballers in Tanzania
Kenyan expatriate sportspeople in Tanzania
Tanzanian Premier League players